Greens Farms Academy (GFA) is a PreK-12 independent preparatory co-educational day school in the Greens Farms section of Westport, Connecticut, drawing 715 students from numerous towns across Fairfield County. Greens Farms Academy is located on a 42-acre campus overlooking the Long Island Sound, a salt marsh and an Audubon woodland.

Greens Farms Academy is located less than five minutes walking distance away from the Metro North train station.

History 
Founded in 1925 as The Bolton School in 1925 by Mrs. Mary E.E. Bolton and her sister, Miss Katherine Laycock. The founders’ main goal was to educate Bolton’s 2 daughters. At the end of the first year, there was 14 girls enrolled in the all woman's preparatory school. The name was then changed to the Kathleen Laycock Country Day School as the sisters moved the school to a 26 acre campus, sold to them by the  Bedford/Vanderbilt family. In 1969, the trustees voted to admit males. Believing that it would be difficult to attract male students to “The Kathleen Laycock Country Day”, the school was renamed to Greens Farms Academy and in September 1970, 23 young men joined 300 young women at the school.

Facilites 
Located on a 44 acre campus, the school borders 3 ecosystems: the salt marsh, Audubon woodland, and the Long Island School. The main building is a Gilded Age mansion designed by architect Harrie T. Lindberg, the Stamford White protegé who was called “the American Lutyens”. 

The Greens Farms MetroNorth train station is located roughly 370 steps from the campus. 

Recent construction includes a stunning new Performing Arts Center, including a state-of-the-art theatre, a scene/STEAM shop, and a Global Studies Center—all topped by solar panels and a living roof. There’s also a squash center, a new wrestling gym, and a sparkling new fitness center.

References

Buildings and structures in Westport, Connecticut
Schools in Fairfield County, Connecticut
Private high schools in Connecticut
Educational institutions established in 1925
Private middle schools in Connecticut
Private elementary schools in Connecticut
1925 establishments in Connecticut